Salum Machaku (born 10 August 1990) is a Tanzanian football midfielder.

References

1990 births
Living people
Tanzanian footballers
Tanzania international footballers
Azam F.C. players
Mtibwa Sugar F.C. players
Simba S.C. players
Polisi FC players
Lipuli F.C. players
Association football midfielders
Tanzanian Premier League players